A Meter Point Administration Number, also known as MPAN, Supply Number or S-Number, is a 21-digit reference used in Great Britain to uniquely identify electricity supply points such as individual domestic residences. The system was introduced in 1998 to aid creation of a competitive environment for the electricity companies, and allows consumers to switch their supplier easily as well as simplifying administration. Although the name suggests that an MPAN refers to a particular meter, an MPAN can have several meters associated with it, or indeed none where it is an unmetered supply. A supply receiving power from the network operator (DNO) has an import MPAN, while generation and microgeneration projects feeding back into the DNO network are given export MPANs.

The equivalent for gas supplies is the Meter Point Reference Number and the water/wastewater equivalent for non-household customers is the Supply Point ID.

Structure 

An MPAN is commonly separated into two sections: the core and the top line data. The core is the final 13 digits and is the unique identifier. The top line data gives information about the characteristics of the supply and is the responsibility of the supplier.

The full MPAN is required to be depicted on electricity bills (the boxes on the top and bottom line are generally unaligned).

The core data is on the second line, the supplementary data on the first.  Only the last digit on the bottom row is the check digit.

Profile Class (PC) 

The first two digits of a full MPAN reflect its profile class.

Profile class 00 supplies are half-hourly (HH) metered, i.e. they record electricity consumption for every half hour of every day, and supplies of the other profile classes are non-half-hourly (NHH) metered. A NHH supply must be upgraded to HH where:

HH data is recorded by the meter and collected by an onsite download, or by remote communication methods such as GSM, SMS, GPRS or telephone line.

Domestic NHH import MPANs always have a profile class of 01 or 02. Domestic NHH export MPANs are allocated a profile class of 08.

Meter Time Switch Code (MTC) 
The MTC is a 3 digit code that reflects the various registers a meter may have, such as a single rate, day/night split, or a seasonal time of day.

Line Loss Factor Class (LLFC) 

The Line Loss Factor Class or LLFC is an alphanumeric code used to identify the related Distribution Use of System (DUoS) charges for the MPAN. The figure reflects both the amount of distribution infrastructure used to supply the exit point and the amount of energy lost through heating of cables, transformers, etc.

Core 
The MPAN core is the final 13 digits of the MPAN, and uniquely identifies an exit point. It consists of a two-digit Distributor ID, followed by an eight-digit unique identifier, then by two digits and a single check digit.

Distributor ID 

Great Britain is divided into fourteen distribution areas. For each area a single company, the distribution network operator, has a licence to distribute electricity. They effectively carry electricity from the National Grid to the exit points (each having a unique MPAN and a possibility of several meters) where the customers are.  The owner of the distribution network charges electricity suppliers for carrying the electricity in their network. Their DNO licensed regions are the same geographic areas as the former nationalised electricity boards.

In addition to the distribution network operators noted above who are licensed for a specific geographic area, there are also independent distribution network operators (IDNOs). These own and operate electricity distribution networks which are mostly network extensions connected to the existing distribution network, e.g. to serve new housing developments.

Scottish Hydro Electric Power Distribution also provide distribution services in South Scotland as an IDNO and Southern Electric Power Distribution provide IDNO services in all other England and Wales areas. Other IDNOs have no "base" area.

MPAN state 

The supply identified by the MPAN can be in one of four states: disconnected, de-energised, live, and new.

 Disconnected: The service cable has been removed and the MPAN will not be reused.
 De-energised: The service cable is in place, but the fuse has been removed. The meter remains connected to the distribution network, but no electricity can be used.
 Live: Both the service cable and the fuse are in place. The supply is fully operational.
 New: A new MPAN has been generated, however, the top line (supplementary data consisting of the Profile Class and Meter Time-Switch Code) is not yet complete. The service cable may or may not be installed.

These terms are by no means standardised. For example, a disconnected supply might be referred to as a 'dead' supply.

Export MPANs 
The vast majority of MPANs are import MPANs, where energy is being consumed. However, if a supply exports to the distribution network, then an export MPAN is issued. If a supply both imports and exports, then both an import MPAN and export MPAN are issued.

Microgeneration 
Formerly, export MPANs required a half-hourly compliant meter to be installed. Since 2003, it has been possible for microgeneration projects, with a capacity of 30 kW or below, to have a non-half-hourly meter to measure export back into the distribution network. Uptake was slow, with the first microgeneration export MPAN being issued in June 2005. Some suppliers may not bother to register the export MPAN in MPAS as the revenue is so small.

Following the closure of the feed-in tariffs, in January 2020 Ofgem introduced the Smart Export Guarantee (SEG) arrangements, where an export MPAN is allocated to allow a supplier to pay a customer for export of low-carbon energy.

Export capacity over 30 kW is required to be half-hourly metered.  As part of the Marketwide Half Hourly Arrangements (MHHS), all export consumption will be required to be registered and settled on a half-hourly basis.

Metered Supply Point 
The Metered Supply Point (MSP) is the point at which the meter measuring a customer's consumption is located. It is thus also the point at which either the distribution network operator's supply, or the building network operator's lateral cable, terminates and the customer's equipment begins. In order to firmly establish a supply's MSP, the MPAN needs to be associated with a meter serial number.

Although it is common for an MPAN to be associated with one meter serial number, in some cases there is a many-to-many relationship. For example, one meter could be associated with both an import and an export MPAN, or one MPAN could be measured by three separate meters.

Metering Code of Practice

Unmetered supplies

It is possible for small predictable supplies to be unmetered. Examples are street lights, traffic signals, signs, bollards, telephone kiosks, CCTV and advertising displays.

For a piece of equipment to be connected to the distribution network via an unmetered connection, its consumption should not exceed 500 watts and it should operate in a predictable manner, with no provision for it to be manually turned on at the end user's request. Generally the equipment would either be in operation and taking a supply of electricity 24 hours a day, or be controlled by a photocell, as is often the case for street lights.

It is the customer's responsibility to maintain an accurate and up-to-date inventory of unmetered supplies, and to inform the UMSO (UnMetered Supplies Operator) of all changes to the connected equipment.

Larger local authorities generally have unmetered supplies with a demand over 100kW and are required to trade their unmetered energy on a half-hourly basis. To do so, they employ a meter administrator who will use daily data from a photo-electric control unit (PECU) array which is then used to calculate the energy consumption. A PECU array is a device that holds a representative number of the photocells that authority uses on their street lights or traffic signals. By trading energy as unmetered half-hourly the authority will accurately pay for the energy consumed by their declared unmetered equipment, and because the data is downloaded daily the authority will see their energy invoices change throughout the year to represent the changes in season and daily lighting levels.

If, however, the unmetered supplies are being traded as non half-hourly the UMSO undertakes the responsibility to calculate an EAC (Estimated Annual Consumption). This is done using a simple formula which takes into account the circuit watts of the equipment and the annual hours of operation. For example, a piece of equipment that is in use 24 hours per day will have annual hours of 8766. For, say, a CCTV camera rated at 24 circuit watts the EAC would be 210.384kWh, calculated as circuit watts × annual hours divided by 1000.  As a result of Ofgem's decision to progress with Marketwide Half Hourly Settlement (MHHS) all new unmetered supplies and existing non-half hourly unmetered supplies are expected to move to half hourly trading from 2023 onwards.

If the equipment is street lighting the same process is used; however, the annual hours will change as each photocell is assigned a set number of annual hours which indicate how and when the lights turn on and off. These annual hours have been set by Elexon and are not locally agreed with the UMSO by the customer.

Once an EAC calculation has taken place, an EAC Certificate is provided to the customer's appointed electricity supplier for billing, with an electronic copy of the EAC being sent to the appointed data collector. The DNO make a Distribution Use of System charge on the electricity supplier for the delivery of the electricity to the customer's unmetered equipment.

Standard Settlement Configuration (SSC) 

Each non-half-hourly supply has a four digit code called the Standard Settlement Configuration (SSC), which specifies the number of registers a meter has, and the times that each register is recording electricity usage. The times that a register is recording is specified with a five digit code Time Pattern Regime (TPR). So for example a supply with SSC 0943 has two registers with TPRs 00404 and 00405. The 00404 TPR register records from 01:00 to 02:30 and 08:00 to 23:30, and the 00405 register records for the rest of the time.

Meter Point Administration System 

Each DNO operates a Meter Point Administration System (MPAS) which holds the following information for each MPAN:

 Supplier
 Data Collector (DC)
 Data Aggregator (DA)
 Meter Operator (MOP) or Meter Administrator for HH unmetered
 Customer
 Address of the exit point
 Associated MPANs
 MPAN state
 Profile Class (PC)
 Line Loss Factor Class (LLFC)
 Meter Time Switch Class (MTC)
 GSP Group

MPRS is the name of the software package that implements the MPAS system for all DNOs. Since MPRS is used by most DNOs it is often used interchangeably with the term MPAS.

ECOES 

ECOES (formally the Electricity Central Online Enquiry Service) is now the Electricity Enquiry Service (EES) is a website that allows users and authorised industry parties to search for supply details (past and present) using such things as the 13-digit MPAN bottom line number, the meter serial number or the postcode. The user can determine a wide range of data relating to the supply including the full address, meter details, the current energisation status and also the appointed parties (i.e. the supplier, distributor, MOP, DC and DA). The site is populated from information sent from the supplier regarding the metering system.

Only non-domestic users (with two valid MPANs that are not Profile Class 1 or 2) can register to access this service.

Check digit modulus

Check digit 
The final digit in the MPAN is the check digit, and validates the previous 12 (the core) using a modulus 11 test. The check digit is calculated thus:

 Multiply the first digit by 3
 Multiply the second digit by the next prime number (5)
 Repeat this for each digit (missing 11 out on the list of prime numbers for the purposes of this algorithm)
 Add up all these products
 The check digit is the sum modulo 11 modulo 10.

See also 
 Energy accounting software
 Meter operator
 Mains electricity
 Distribution network operator
 Electrical power industry
 Electricity billing in the UK

External links 
 Specific definitions of meter timeswitch codes can be found on the MRASCo documentation page.
 ECOES (Electricity Central Online Enquiry Service)
 Implementations of the MPAN check digit algorithm

References

Electric power in the United Kingdom
Electricity meters